Harlan Miller (born June 20, 1994) is an American football safety for the Massachusetts Pirates of the Indoor Football League (IFL). He played college football at Southeastern Louisiana, and was drafted by the Arizona Cardinals in the sixth round of the 2016 NFL Draft.

Professional career

Arizona Cardinals
Miller was selected in the sixth round (205th overall) by the Arizona Cardinals in the 2016 NFL Draft. He signed a four-year contract with the Cardinals on May 9, 2016. On September 3, 2016, Miller was released by the Cardinals, but was signed to the practice squad the next day. He was promoted to the active roster on December 19, 2016.

On September 2, 2017, Miller was waived by the Cardinals and was signed to the practice squad the next day. He was promoted to the active roster on November 13, 2017. He was waived on November 28, 2017 and was re-signed to the practice squad. He was promoted back to the active roster on December 7, 2017.

On May 9, 2018, Miller was released by the Cardinals. On August 15, 2018, Miller was re-signed by the Cardinals. He was waived on September 1, 2018.

Washington Redskins
On December 18, 2018, Miller was signed by the Washington Redskins. He was waived on April 30, 2019.

Los Angeles Wildcats
Miller was drafted in the 7th round during phase four of the 2020 XFL Draft by the Los Angeles Wildcats. He had his contract terminated when the league suspended operations on April 10, 2020.

Massachusetts Pirates
On December 9, 2021, Miller signed with the Massachusetts Pirates of the Indoor Football League (IFL). On January 17, 2023, Miller re-signed with the Pirates.

References

External links
 Arizona Cardinals bio
 Southeastern Louisiana Lions bio
 

1994 births
Living people
Players of American football from Louisiana
People from Kentwood, Louisiana
American football cornerbacks
Southeastern Louisiana Lions football players
Arizona Cardinals players
Washington Redskins players
Los Angeles Wildcats (XFL) players